The Gorgon (Italian: La Gorgona) is a 1942 Italian historical drama film directed by Guido Brignone and starring Mariella Lotti, Rossano Brazzi and Camillo Pilotto. It was adapted from the play by Sem Benelli and is set in the Republic of Pisa during the eleventh century.

It was shot at the Scalera Studios in Rome.

Cast
 Mariella Lotti as Spina di Pietro, la Gorgona 
 Rossano Brazzi as Lamberto Finquinaldo 
 Camillo Pilotto as Marcello Finquinaldo, padre di Lamberto 
 Piero Carnabuci as Arrigo del Coscetto 
 Annibale Betrone as Il conte Ranieri 
 Tina Lattanzi as La contessa Matilde di Toscana 
 Lauro Gazzolo as Il fedele servo di Spina 
 Enza Delbi as Bianca 
 Gorella Gori as Berta 
 Emilio Cigoli as Miniato - lo scudiero 
 Giulia Martinelli as Celeste 
 Amelia Beretta as Berta 
 Achille Majeroni as Il console Marignano 
 Cesare Fantoni as Pietro Moricone - vescovo 
 Giorgio Capecchi as Capitano Borso 
 Giovanni Onorato as Nicastro 
 Tatiana Farnese as Figlia del conte Ranieri 
 Loli Bonfanti as Seconda figlia 
 Amedeo Trilli as Il guardiano marito di Angela 
 Raimondo Van Riel as Pietro Capronesi

References

Bibliography 
 Goble, Alan. The Complete Index to Literary Sources in Film. Walter de Gruyter, 1999.

External links 
 

1942 films
1940s historical drama films
Italian historical drama films
Italian black-and-white films
1940s Italian-language films
Films directed by Guido Brignone
Films set in the 11th century
Films shot at Scalera Studios
1942 drama films
Films scored by Enzo Masetti
1940s Italian films